Operation Wikinger (English: "Viking") was a German naval sortie into the North Sea by the Kriegsmarine in February 1940 during the Second World War. Poor inter-service communication and cooperation between the Kriegsmarine and the Luftwaffe resulted in the loss of two German warships through friendly fire bombing and German or British mines.

Background
By February 1940, the Kriegsmarine sought to disrupt the activities of British fishing vessels around the Dogger Bank. As Luftwaffe reconnaissance flights also reported the presence of submarines, it was decided to intercept the British vessels with the six destroyers of the 1st Destroyer Flotilla: Friedrich Eckoldt (flotilla leader), Richard Beitzen, Erich Koellner, Theodor Riedel, Max Schultz and Leberecht Maass, to be escorted by Luftwaffe fighters.

At about the same time, a postponed anti-shipping operation over the North Sea was performed using two squadrons of Heinkel He 111 bombers from X. Fliegerkorps.

The Kriegsmarine, denied a naval air wing, depended on the Luftwaffe for air support. Communication between the navy and air force was both inefficient and ineffective.

Execution
The naval sortie began at 19:00 on 19 February 1940. The flotilla, operating from their anchorage near Wilhelmshaven off Schillig, proceeded quickly through a cleared channel between German defensive minefields, clearly visible but without the requested air cover.

A German bomber on the anti-merchant shipping mission passed the flotilla twice, uncertain of the ships' status and making no recognition signals. Equally unaware of the air mission, the flotilla misidentified the bomber as a British reconnaissance aircraft and attacked it. The bomber then counterattacked the flotilla. One of three bombs hit Leberecht Maass. While the rest of the flotilla was ordered to continue in formation, Friedrich Eckoldt moved to help. The bomber made a second run. Two more bombs hit Leberecht Maass, which was broken in two by large explosions. As the bomber returned to base, the remainder of the flotilla tried to rescue the crew of the Leberecht Maass. Just after 20:00, Max Schultz exploded and sank, probably striking a mine. Chaos followed amid erroneous reports of new air attack, submarines detected, and torpedoes fired. Theodor Riedel dropped depth charges on a supposed British submarine; the explosions temporarily jammed its rudder. After 30 minutes of violent confusion, the flotilla commander ordered the surviving four ships to return to base. There were no survivors from Max Schultz and only 60 from Leberecht Maass: in all, 578 German sailors died.

Aftermath
The initial view of the naval command of Marinegruppe West in Wilhelmshaven was that the flotilla had hit a German minefield. Enemy involvement was discounted. At 23:00, X. Fliegerkorps informed the naval command that a ship had been bombed and sunk in the area of the sortie. The official investigation confirmed that operational information had been inadequately communicated. Neither the destroyers' officers and sailors nor the aircrew knew of the other's presence or intent. No responsible officers were held accountable for the "friendly fire" incident.

See also
 Friendly fire incidents of World War II
List of German military equipment of World War II

References

North Sea operations of World War II
Friendly fire incidents of World War II
February 1940 events